Camp Washington may refer to:
Camp Washington, Cincinnati, a residential neighborhood
Camp Washington, Maryland, the 1928 military installation with the 12th Infantry Regiment
Camp Washington, Staten Island
Camp Washington, Connecticut, an Episcopal retreat center